Wayside is an unincorporated community located along the border of Tinton Falls Borough and Ocean Township in Monmouth County, New Jersey, United States. The community is largely residential though some churches, parks, and schools are located in the area. The main arterial roads in the community are Hope Road (through which the Tinton Falls–Ocean Township municipal line runs), Wayside Road (County Route 38 in Tinton Falls), and West Park Avenue. Access to New Jersey Route 18 is available via nearby interchanges with Deal Road, West Park Avenue, and Wayside Road; the Garden State Parkway's exit 105 is also located north of Wayside.  The building that once housed the 16-lane Wayside Bowl-O-Drome is still in use, now as an office building.

Notable people
People who were born in, residents of, or otherwise closely associated with Wayside include:
 Bob Davis (born 1945), former NFL quarterback whose career included three seasons with the New York Jets.
 Trent Hindman (born 1995), racing driver who won the 2014 Continental Tire Sports Car Challenge in the GS class.
 Oren Liebermann, CNN International Jerusalem correspondent
 Wendy Williams (born 1964), media personality and former radio jock host of The Wendy Williams Show.

References

Tinton Falls, New Jersey
Ocean Township, Monmouth County, New Jersey
Unincorporated communities in Monmouth County, New Jersey
Unincorporated communities in New Jersey